Shelton Moses currently plays for Chennai Spartans in the Pro Volleyball League.

Early life 
He started playing at school in Pollachi Tamil Nadu with the Red Star Volleyball Club. His height was the reason that the seniors at the club got me to join them. He went for a month-long summer camp, and when in class XI, He attended the trials for Thiruchirappallai Sports Hostel and got selected. In class XII, He got selected for Junior Nationals and the following year, He joined college at St Joseph, Thiruchirappallai.

Professional life 
He joined in Indian Overseas Bank in 2004 on sports quota. They have always been supportive and encouraging him. And is Coach Kalaiselvan, who played a key role in shaping his career through school and college. And, then he participating in the Youth World Championship in 2004. For the first time with Senior India in 2007 at the Central Asia Cup in Pakistan and they won the gold medal, Silver in the 2007 Commonwealth Championship. Playing in the Asian Championship in 2007 and the 2010 Rashid Memorial.

References

Indian men's volleyball players
1984 births
Living people
People from Coimbatore district
Volleyball players from Tamil Nadu